The Mixed 3 m springboard synchro competition of the 2018 European Aquatics Championships was held on 8 August 2018.

Results
The final was started at 13:30.

References

Mixed 3 m springboard synchro
European Aquatics Championships